Duratec is a brand name of the Ford Motor Company used for the company's range of gasoline-powered four-cylinder, five-cylinder and six-cylinder passenger car engines.

The original 1993 Duratec V6 engine was designed by Ford and Porsche. Ford first introduced this engine in the Ford Mondeo. Over time, "Duratec" became an omnibus name for Ford's gasoline engines unrelated to the original V6. The Ford Zeta engine, Ford Sigma engine and Ford Cyclone engine all carry the Duratec name, but are otherwise unrelated to each other or the original 1993 Duratec V6. The ambiguous use of the name is similar to Ford's use of the Zetec for the previous generation of gasoline engines, the Duratorq name for diesel engines, and EcoBoost for turbocharged gasoline engines.

Names reference

References

Ford engines
Gasoline engines by model